Claude is a French given name for males originating from the Latin name Claudius, itself deriving from "claudicatio" meaning "strong willed". It can also be an uncommon given name for females or a family name.

Men
Claude, Duke of Aumale (1526–1573)
Claude, Duke of Guise (1496–1550)
Claude de la Colombière (1641–1682), Christian saint
Claude of Besançon (c. 607–696 or 699), Christian saint, priest, monk, abbot and bishop
"Claude", traditional name in English for Claude Lorrain (c. 1600–1682), French landscape painter, draughtsman and etcher
Claude Akins (1926–1994), American actor
Claude Barrès (1925–1959), French officer
Claude Beausoleil (1948–2020), Canadian poet and writer
Claude Boissol (1920–2016), French film director and screenwriter
Claude Bouton, Lord of Corbaron
Claude Chappe (1763-1805), French inventor
Claude Choules (1901–2011), British WWI veteran and last combat veteran from any nation
Claude Corea (1894-1962), Permanent Representative of Sri Lanka to the United Nations from 1958-1961
Claude Crowl (1892–1915), a former Australian rules footballer with St Kilda
Claude Dallas (born 1950), self-styled "Mountain Man" and convicted murderer of two U.S. game wardens
Claude Dauphin (1951–2015), French commodities trader
Claude Debussy (1862–1918), French composer
Claude Demetrius (1916–1988), African-American songwriter
Claude Duval, (1643–1670), French-born gentleman highwayman in post-Restoration Britain
Claude François (1939–1978), French musician
Claude Galopin, French automotive engineer
Claude Gillingwater (1870–1939), American actor
Claude Giroux (born 1988), French-Canadian professional ice hockey player and captain of the Philadelphia Flyers
Claude Hipps (1927–2017), American football player
Claude Hulbert (1900–1964), British comic actor
Claude Janiak (born 1948), Swiss politician
Claude Julien (born 1960), Canadian ice hockey coach in the National Hockey League
Claude Kelly, American singer and song writer
Claude A. Larkin (1891–1969), American Marine general
Claude Lévi-Strauss (1908–2009), French anthropologist
Claude Louis Berthollet (1748–1822), French chemist
Claude Lemieux (born 1965), retired ice hockey player in the National Hockey League
Claude Makélélé (born 1973), French football manager and former player
Claude McKay (1889-1948), Jamaican writer and poet
Claude Monet (1840–1926), French painter
Claude F. Morris (1869–1957), Justice of the Montana Supreme Court
Claude Mutafian (1942), French writer, historian and mathematician
Claude Netter (1924–2007), French Olympic champion foil fencer
Claude Nicollier (born 1944), first Swiss astronaut
Claude Patrick (born 1980), Canadian mixed martial arts fighter
Claude Piron (1931–2008), linguist and psychologist
Claude Rains (1889–1967), British-born American actor
Claude Ramsey (1943–2018), American farmer and politician
Claude Rapin (born 19??), archaeologist specialising in Central Asian studies
Claude C. Robinson (1881–1976), Canadian ice hockey and sports executive
Claude Rouer (1929–2021), French road cyclist
 Claude Sandoz (born 1946), Swiss visual artist
Claude Shannon (1916–2001), American information theorist, mathematician, and electrical engineer
Claude Sintes (born 1953), French archaeologist and curator
Claude Joseph Vernet (1714–1789), French painter
Claude Weaver (1867–1954), American politician
Claude Weaver III (1923–1944), American-Canadian World War II flying ace

Women
Claude de Bectoz (1490–1547), writer, intellectual, abbess and correspondent of Francis I of France
Claude of France (1499–1524),  queen consort of King Francis I of France and Duchess of Brittany
Claude of France (1547–1575), second daughter of King Henry II of France and Catherine de' Medici
Claude B. Levenson (1938–2010), French journalist and writer
Claude de Vin des Œillets (1637–1687), a mistress of King Louis XIV of France
Claude Cahun (1894–1954), French surrealist photographer, sculptor and writer
Claude Chirac (born 1962), daughter of Jacques Chirac
Claude Gensac (1927–2016), French actress
Claude Jade (1948–2006), French actress
Claude or Claudia Moatti (born 1954), French historian specialising in Roman Studies
Claude Mérelle (1888–1976), French actress
Claude Nollier (1919–2009), French actress
Claude Pompidou (1912–2007), widow of President Georges Pompidou
Claude Scott-Mitchell, Australian actress

Fictional characters
Claude, from the anime series Beyblade G-Revolution
Claude, from the Bleach franchise
Claude, eponymous dog from the Claude series of books by Alex T. Smith
Claude, protagonist of the video game Grand Theft Auto III
Claude, young numbat in the 2007 Australian film Gumnutz: A Juicy Tale
Claude, from the television series Heroes
Claude, uncle of Hugo Cabret in the novel The Invention of Hugo Cabret
Claude, French character in the children's television series The Raggy Dolls
Claude, from the children's animated series Timothy Goes to School
Claude, a rabbit villager in the video game series Animal Crossing
Claude of Valois, from the television series Reign
Claude Hooper Bukowski, protagonist of the musical Hair
Claude Cat, from the Looney Tunes and Merrie Melodies cartoon series from Warner Bros.
Claude Faustus, demonic butler from the Black Butler franchise
 Claude Fitzwilliam, title character in the 1967 American romantic comedy film Fitzwilly 
Claude Frollo, villain of the Victor Hugo novel The Hunchback of Notre-Dame
Claude von Riegan, one of the three main lords from the video games Fire Emblem: Three Houses and Fire Emblem Warriors: Three Hopes
Claude Speed, protagonist of the video game Grand Theft Auto 2
Claude Sterling, villain from the manga adaptation of the "Vampire Kisses" book series
Cloud Strife or Claude Strauss, protagonist of Final Fantasy VII
Claude Wallace, protagonist of the video game Valkyria Chronicles 4
Claude Wheeler, main character of Willa Cather's One of Ours

See also 
 Claud, a given name
 Claude (disambiguation)

References

French unisex given names
French masculine given names
French feminine given names
English masculine given names

de:Claude
ko:클로드
it:Claudio
nl:Claudius
ja:クロード
pl:Klaudiusz
sv:Claudius (olika betydelser)